Stellarium is a free and open-source planetarium, licensed under the terms of the GNU General Public License version 2, available for Linux, Windows, and macOS. A port of Stellarium called Stellarium Mobile is available for Android, iOS, and Symbian as a paid version, being developed by Noctua Software. All versions use OpenGL to render a realistic projection of the night sky in real time.

Stellarium was featured on SourceForge in May 2006 as Project of the Month.

History
In 2006, Stellarium 0.7.1 won a gold award in the Education category of the Les Trophées du Libre free software competition.

A modified version of Stellarium has been used by the MeerKAT project as a virtual sky display showing where the antennae of the radiotelescope are pointed.

In December 2011, Stellarium was added as one of the "featured applications" in the Ubuntu Software Center.

Planetarium dome projection
The fisheye and spherical mirror distortion features allow Stellarium to be projected onto domes.  Spherical mirror distortion is used in projection systems that use a digital video projector and a first surface convex spherical mirror to project images onto a dome. Such systems are generally cheaper than traditional planetarium projectors and fish-eye lens projectors and for that reason are used in budget and home planetarium setups where projection quality is less important.

Various companies which build and sell digital planetarium systems use Stellarium, such as e-Planetarium.

Digitalis Education Solutions, which helped develop Stellarium, created a fork called Nightshade which was specifically tailored to planetarium use.

VirGO
VirGO is a Stellarium plugin, a visual browser for the European Southern Observatory (ESO) Science Archive Facility which allows astronomers to browse professional astronomical data. It is no longer supported or maintained; the last version was 1.4.5, dated January 15, 2010.

Stellarium Mobile 
Stellarium Mobile is a fork of Stellarium, developed by some of the Stellarium team members. It currently targets mobile devices running Symbian, Maemo, Android, and iOS. Some of the mobile optimisations have been integrated into the mainline Stellarium product.

Screenshots

See also

Space flight simulation game
List of space flight simulation games
Planetarium software
List of observatory software

References

External links

 Stellarium Web Online Planetarium

2001 software
Cross-platform software
Free astronomy software
Free educational software
Free software programmed in C++
Planetarium software for Linux
Portable software
Science software for macOS
Science software for Windows
Software that uses Qt